Tempesta may refer to:

 The Tempest (Giorgione), a famous Renaissance painting by Italian master Giorgione dated between 1506 and 1508
 Tempesta (film), a 2004 thriller film by Tim Disney

See also
 Tempesta (surname)